"Lucky" is a song co-written and recorded by Canadian country artist Jade Eagleson. The track was co-written with Travis Wood, as well as the track's producers Todd Clark and Gavin Slate. It was the third single from Eagleson's debut self-titled album Jade Eagleson, and became his first #1 on the Canada Country chart. It was nominated for "Single of the Year" at the 2020 Country Music Alberta Awards.

Critical reception
Katie Colley of ET Canada called the song "catchy".

Track listings
Digital download - single
 "Lucky" – 3:18
 "Good Country People" – 3:23

Chart performance
"Lucky" peaked at number one on the Billboard Canada Country chart for the week of March 21, 2020, giving Eagleson his first number-one hit. The song was the most-played domestic song on Canadian country radio in 2020.

References

2019 songs
2019 singles
Jade Eagleson songs
Universal Music Canada singles
Songs written by Jade Eagleson
Songs written by Todd Clark
Songs written by Gavin Slate
Songs written by Travis Wood (songwriter)
Song recordings produced by Todd Clark
Song recordings produced by Gavin Slate